Colebra (variously Bago-alas or Culebra Islet) is an island in northeastern Iloilo, Philippines. It is part of the municipality of Concepcion.

Location and geography 

Colebra Island is east of Panay Island in the Visayan Sea.

See also 

 List of islands in the Philippines

References

External links
 Colebra Island at OpenStreetMap

Islands of Iloilo